Baron Amherst may refer to:

 Baron Amherst of Holmesdale in the County of Kent (Peerage of Great Britain) — created in 1776 for Jeffery Amherst and extinct in 1797.
 Baron Amherst, of Montreal in the County of Kent (Peerage of Great Britain) — created in 1788 for Jeffery Amherst, 1st Baron Amherst and extinct in 1993.
 Baron Amherst of Hackney (Peerage of the United Kingdom) — created in 1892 for William Tyssen-Amherst; extant.

See also
 Earl Amherst
 Amherst (disambiguation)

Extinct baronies in the Peerage of Great Britain
Noble titles created in 1776
Noble titles created in 1788
Peerages created with special remainders